Ras El Oued is a town and commune in Bordj Bou Arréridj Province, Algeria. According to the 2008 census, it has a population of 44,947.

References

Communes of Bordj Bou Arréridj Province
Cities in Algeria
Algeria